Francis Reynald Wewengkang (born 10 January 1971 in Manado) usually called Francis Wewengkang or Enal, is a former Indonesian football player. He last played for Pro Titan. Nowadays he is an assistant coach at Persita Tangerang.

References

1971 births
Living people
People from Manado
Indonesian footballers
Indonesia international footballers
1996 AFC Asian Cup players
Persma Manado players
Persikota Tangerang players
Persija Jakarta players
Persibom Bolaang Mongondow players
Pro Duta FC players
Indonesian Premier Division players
Terengganu F.C. II players
Sportspeople from North Sulawesi
Association football midfielders